Hawick FC could refer to the following:

 Hawick RFC (rugby union)
 Hawick Harlequins RFC (rugby union)
 Hawick Royal Albert F.C. (association football)

Hawick